The Stroke-ornamented ware (culture) or (German) Stichbandkeramik (abbr. STK or STbK), Stroked Pottery culture, Danubian Ib culture of V. Gordon Childe, or Middle Danubian culture is the successor of the Linear Pottery culture, a major archaeological horizon of the European Neolithic  in Central Europe. 
The STK flourishes during approximately  4900-4400 BC.
Centered on Silesia in Poland, eastern Germany, and the northern Czech Republic, it overlaps with the Lengyel horizon to the south and the Rössen culture to the west.

Description
The STbK and the Notenkopfkeramik are a development of the LBK. Much of the Musical Note pottery features incised zig-zag bands going around the pot, with punctures at the line segment junctions. The STK abandons incision in favor bands of small punctures, also in zig-zag patterns, with a vertical band dividing each angle. The effect is a band pattern of contiguous A-frames.

Where the Musical Note pottery expanded east over the Bug River, the STK moved down the Vistula and Elbe. The spread of this style must have been basically the transmission of cultural objects.
The homes of the STK people show a slight modification that became a major feature of later cultures: one end of the long house was made shorter than the other to achieve a trapezoidal shape. The reason for this modification remains obscure. Also, the STK people developed a preference for cremation rather than burial. The preceding early LBK had used both methods.

Gosek circle

An unusual structure associated with STK has been found at Gosek, south of Berlin: a large, double concentric ring of post holes pierced by gates and surrounded by a circular ditch. The placement of the gates and some of the posts lead some investigators to hypothesize an observatory similar to Stonehenge, but in wood rather than stone; i.e., the posts mark some positions of celestial bodies.

Gallery

References

External links

Stichbandkeramik (Baldia)

Archaeological cultures of Central Europe
Stone Age Europe
Archaeological cultures in Austria
Archaeological cultures in the Czech Republic
Archaeological cultures in Germany
Archaeological cultures in Poland